James Donaldson may refer to:

James Donaldson (classical scholar) (1831–1915), Scottish classical scholar, and educational and theological writer
James Donaldson (basketball) (born 1957), retired professional English-American basketball player
James Donaldson (publisher) (1751–1830), publisher of the Edinburgh Advertiser; founder of Donaldson's Hospital
James Donaldson (rugby league) (born 1991), English rugby league player
James Donaldson (cricketer) (born 1943), English cricketer
James A. Donaldson (1941–2019), American mathematician
James Lowry Donaldson (1814–1885), American soldier and author
Jamie Donaldson (born 1975), Welsh golfer
Jimmy Donaldson or MrBeast (born 1998), American YouTuber